The 2006 Intense Football League season was the second season of the Intense Football League, since the league temporarily suspended operations in 2005. The league champions were the Odessa Roughnecks, who defeated the Corpus Christi Hammerheads in Intense Bowl II.

Standings

 Green indicates clinched playoff berth
 Black indicates best regular season record

Playoffs

External links
 2006 Stats

Intense Football League
Intense Football League seasons